Vasily Andreyevich Zolotarev, also romanized as Zolotaryov (February 24, 1872 in Taganrog – May 25, 1964 in Moscow), was a Russian (Soviet) composer and music teacher.

Biography
Vasily Zolotarev was born to a Greek family named Kuyumzhi (Куюмжи) or Kouyoumtzis in the city of Taganrog in 1872. The family name was later changed to the more Russian Zolotarev. He studied music at the Saint Petersburg Conservatory under direction of Mily Balakirev (1893–1898) in the class of Nikolai Rimsky-Korsakov (1898–1900), graduating in 1900. Zolotarev lectured at Moscow Conservatory (1909–1918), at the Belarus State Academy of Music (Белорусская государственная консерватория им. А. В. Луначарского) in 1933–1941, and other conservatories. Among his students in Minsk was Mieczysław Weinberg.

Zolotaryov was a prolific composer and left behind a large body of works: three operas, ballets, seven symphonies (1902-1962), three concerti, cantatas, romances, six string quartets, and other works. Among his stage works are: The Decembrists, revised as Kondraty Ryleyev, libretto by Yasinovsky,1957 (presented in a concert performance on 29.08.1857, Moscow), Khvestko Andyber, 1928 (written during his teaching in Ukraine, presented in a concert performance in Kiev, 1928 and printed by Kharkov State Publishing House, 1929). He also wrote the operetta Rikiki (1917), the opera Ak-Gulon on Uzbek Themes (1932-34) and the ballet Knyaz’-ozero (‘Prince-lake’) (1949). Zolotaryov’s personal archive is kept at the Belarusian State Archives-Museum of Literature and Art in Minsk. His 7 symphonies, the suite from the ballet Prince-lake and fragments from the opera Decembrists were recorded by the Belarusian State Symphony Orchestra (1971–1973). Melodiya Records Company produced three LPs in 1974, dedicated to the 100-year-jubilee of composer’s birth. There is also a recording of his 6th Symphony My Homeland (1954) and some of his ballet music in the archives of Belarus TV–Radio Company.

Rhapsodie hébraïque
The New York Times wrote of Zolotarev's Rhapsodie hébraïque that it was "based on Hebrew melodies now used in Russia… among the Jewish families of the lower classes. … [Zolotarev] found that upon a Hebrew racial idiom there had been grafted some of the characteristic of Russian music just as the irreducible language of the Jews in any country is overlaid by a few words or modes of expression belonging to the land of their environment. Thus the melodies… are the musical equivalent of Yiddish." They described the melodies as "built upon an Oriental scale… [whose] earmark is an augmented interval instead of that found in the diatonic scale between the third and fourth notes.<ref>"Musical Notes: Concerts, Recitals and Church Choir News", New York Times , 1905-12-17, p. X1.</ref>

Selected works
Stage
 Decembrists (Декабристы), Opera (1925); new edition Kondrati Ryleev, 1957
 Prince Lake (Князь-озеро), Ballet (1949); won the Stalin Prize in 1950

Orchestral
 Fête villageoise (Деревенский праздник; Village Festival), Overture in F major, Op. 4 (1901)
 Rhapsodie hébraïque (Еврейская рапсодия), Op. 7 (1903)
 Symphony No. 1, Op. 8 (1902)
 Ouverture-fantaisie, Op. 22 (1907)

Concertante
 Concerto for cello and orchestra (1963)

Chamber music
 Suite in the Form of Variations (Сюита в форме вариаций) for violin and piano, Op. 2 (1900)
 String Quartet No. 1, Op. 5 (1901)
 String Quartet No. 2 in A minor, Op. 6 (1902)
 2 Novelettes for violin and piano, Op. 11 (1904)
 Piano Quartet in D minor, Op. 13 (1905)
 String Quintet in F minor for 2 violins, viola and 2 cellos, Op. 19 (1905)
 String Quartet No. 3 in D major, Op. 25 (1908)
 Trio for violin, viola and piano, Op. 28 (1910)
 String Quartet No. 4 in B major, Op. 33 (1913)
 Eclogue (Эклога) in A minor for viola and piano, Op. 38 (1921)
 Sonata for violin and piano, Op. 40 (1925)
 String Quartet No. 5 in G major, Op. 46 (1930)
 Capriccio on a Hebrew Melody (Каприччио на еврейскую мелодию) for violin and piano (1938)
 Trio for violin, cello and piano (1953)
 String Quartet No. 6 "on Russian Folk Themes" (на русские народные темы) (1959)
 Poème (Поэма) for cello and piano (1962)

Piano
 Sonata [No. 1], Op. 10 (1904)
 Trois Préludes (Три прелюдии) Op. 18 (1905)
 Ukrainian Songs (Украинские песни), 30 Short Pieces for piano 4-hands, Op. 15 (1925)
 Sonata No. 2, Op. 42 (1927)
 4 Pieces (Четыре пьесы), Op. 43 (1929)
 Trois récits (Три рассказа), Op. 44 (1926)

Choral
 Paradise and the Peri (Рай и Пери), Cantata (1900); awarded the Rubinstein Prize

Vocal
 4 Songs (Четыре романса) for high voice and piano, Op. 1 (1900)
 4 Songs (Четыре романса) for voice and piano, Op. 16 (1904)
 6 Songs (Шесть романсов) for low voice and piano, Op. 17 (1905)

Literary
 Fugue: A Guide to the Practical Study (Фуга: руководство к практическому изучению), Moscow 1956
 Memories of My Great Teachers, Friends and Comrades'' (Воспоминания о моих великих учителях, друзьях и товарищах), Moscow 1957

Awards
 1932 – Honored Artist of the RSFSR
 1940 – Order of the Red Banner of Labour
 1949 – People's Artist of the BSSR
 1950 – Stalin Prize
 1955 – Order of Lenin

References

External links
 Biography on website "Soviet Composers" 
 

1872 births
1964 deaths
Musicians from Taganrog
People from Yekaterinoslav Governorate
Academic staff of Moscow Conservatory
Saint Petersburg Conservatory alumni
Honored Artists of the RSFSR
People's Artists of the Byelorussian Soviet Socialist Republic
Recipients of the Order of Lenin
Recipients of the Order of the Red Banner of Labour
Stalin Prize winners
Male opera composers
Russian people of Greek descent
Russian male classical composers
Russian music educators
Russian opera composers
Soviet male composers
Soviet music educators
Soviet opera composers